Ironclad Games is a Canadian PC game developer. The company was founded in 2003 by former employees of Rockstar Vancouver. Ironclad is located in Burnaby, British Columbia.

Titles
Ironclad released their first game, Sins of a Solar Empire on February 4, 2008, a game that features a mix of components from real-time strategy and 4X strategy games. They released the Entrenchment expansion on February 11, 2009. The second expansion pack, Diplomacy, was released on February 9, 2010: the Sins of a Solar Empire: Trinity combination package, which included the Entrenchment and Diplomacy expansions, was also released on the same day. On February 21, 2012, they announced Sins of a Dark Age, a multiplayer online battle arena game set in a pre-war fantasy environment. A standalone expansion pack called Rebellion, was also released for Sins of a Solar Empire on June 12, 2012.  In 2022 Ironclad announced Sins of a Solar Empire 2, Beta Starting October 27, 2022

Iron engine
Ironclad's Iron Engine supports a number of advanced features including per-pixel specular lighting, dynamic fractal generation, post-process bloom filtering, environment mapping, custom pixel and vertex shaders for all meshes and effects and an advanced particle system.

v1.0 was used in Sins of a Solar Empire (2008).

v2.0 was used in Sins of a Dark Age (2012).

v3.0 is being used in Sins of a Solar Empire 2 (2022)

References

External links
Ironclad website

Video game companies of Canada
Companies based in Burnaby
Canadian companies established in 2003
Video game companies established in 2003
Video game development companies